Dr. Mahathir Mohamad, being the Prime Minister of Malaysia for the second time on 10 May 2018, formed the seventh Mahathir cabinet after being invited by the Yang di-Pertuan Agong, Sultan Muhammad V to form a new government. It was the 20th cabinet of Malaysia formed since independence. Initially, he announced that the Cabinet will be composed of 10 key ministries only representing Pakatan Harapan parties, i.e. Malaysian United Indigenous Party (BERSATU), People's Justice Party (PKR), Democratic Action Party (DAP) and National Trust Party (AMANAH), as he suggested "to being a small Cabinet" rather than to have "a huge Cabinet". Then, on 21 May 2018, that list has expanded by 13 ministries. On 2 July 2018, 13 Ministers and 23 Deputy Ministers took office. It was a cabinet of 28 ministers until their fall on 24 February 2020 following Mahathir's resignation.

Composition 
 Full members 
 (7)
 (6)
 (6)
 (5)
 (3)
 MAP (1)

 Deputy Ministers 
 (7)
 (7)
 (6)
 (5)
 (2)

Council of Eminent Persons (CEP) 
In addition to the Cabinet, Mahathir established a five-members advisory team called "Council of Eminent Persons" or "Council of Elders" (Malay: Majlis Penasihat Kerajaan, literally Government Advisory Council), led by Daim Zainuddin as the council chairman. The purpose of this Council is to advise the Government on matters pertaining to economic and financial matters during the transition of power period. Daim declared the council which had held its final meeting on 17 August 2018, has ended its 100-day term as it has fulfilled the mandate given to it within the specified period.

</onlyinclude>

Changes 
Under this Cabinet:
 A new Ministry of Economic Affairs was established as a result of separation of economic affairs portfolio from the Prime Minister's Department.
 Ministry of Domestic Trade, Co-operatives and Consumerism was reinstated to its old name, Ministry of Domestic Trade and Consumer Affairs.
 Ministry of Energy, Green Technology and Water, Ministry of Natural Resources and Environment, Ministry of Science, Technology and Innovation formed in the previous Cabinet, were merged into two new ministries, namely Ministry of Energy, Science, Technology, Environment and Climate Change and Ministry of Water, Land and Natural Resources.
 Ministry of Entrepreneur Development was reinstated as a result of transfer of such function from the Ministry of International Trade and Industry and the then-Ministry of Domestic Affairs, Co-operatives and Consumerism.
 Ministries of Education and Higher Education were merged. A single Ministry of Education is reinstated.
 Ministry of Plantation Industries and Commodities was renamed as Ministry of Primary Industries.
 Ministry of Rural and Regional Development was reinstated to its old name, Ministry of Rural Development.
 Ministry of Tourism and Culture was renamed as Ministry of Tourism, Art and Culture.

References 

Cabinet of Malaysia
Cabinets established in 2018
2018 establishments in Malaysia
Mahathir
Rotation governments